Elaphropus momvu is a species of ground beetle in the subfamily Trechinae. It was described by Burgeon in 1935.

References

Beetles described in 1935